Chore charts are also called reward charts, behavior charts, chore calendars, chore lists or task lists. A chore chart is a listing used to track and organize the house work. The chart can be physical or virtual and is often a means used by parents to post chores expected of their children.

Different homes have different ways of organizing and implementing a chore system, including simple paper charts tacked on the refrigerator. There has been a lot of research, experiential evidence and discussion of chore charts.

Age appropriate chores 
Chore charts list household tasks, sometimes one chore chart per child and sometimes a combined list. Since children of different abilities and ages can handle various responsibilities, the chores featured on a chore chart can be divided by age. Younger children may not responsibly handle complex chores, but may still be able and want to help around the house.

Reward for chores 
While some parents do not give allowance or reward for household chores, there is evidence that allowance and reward helps to create financially sound adults and teach financial responsibility.

See also
Progress chart

References

Domestic life